Madiwala is a locality in Bangalore, India.

It is close to Koramangala, Bommanahalli, BTM Layout, HSR Layout, Arekere Mico Layout, Bannerghatta Road, Jayanagar, and J. P. Nagar, among other localities. The Bangalore City railway station is eight kilometres from Madiwala. St. John's Medical College, a medical college and hospital, is in the locality. The Madiwala Lake in BTM Layout is one of the largest lakes in Bangalore. The inhabitants are, for the most part, of the middle and upper middle classes.

History

Madiwala is one of the oldest localities in Bangalore. It has been speculated to have been the centre of Bangalore in the past, based on archaeological documents. The temple of Someshwara contains inscriptions that refer to the Chola kings having presided over the construction of the Temple of Someshwara in Madiwala. Madiwala means washerman in Kannada; the locality was named for the community of washermen and washerwomen that once resided in the area.

References

Neighbourhoods in Bangalore